Kevin Morris may refer to:

Kevin Morris (American football) (born 1962), American football coach and former player
Kevin Morris (Australian footballer) (born 1951), Australian retired football player and coach
Kevin Morris (writer) (born 1963), American writer, producer, and lawyer